Wahlströms was a dansband from Vadstena, Sweden, established in 1985.

In 1999, the band participated in the "Dansbandslåten" contest with the song "Blå blå ögon".

On 27 September 2011, it was announced that the band was to be disestablished following the last appearance at Brunnsparken in Örebro on 14 January 2012.

Wahlströms participated at Dansbandskampen in 2008.

Members
Anders Hildeskog - drums, vocals
Tobias "Tobbe" Nyström - keyboard/piano, vocals
Daniel Wahlström - vocals, guitar
Henrik "Turbo" Wallrin - bass, vocals
Chris Andersen - lead guitar, vocals (2008-2009)

Discography

Albums
Blå, blå ögon - 1999
Min ängel (compilation album) - 1999
Lovar & svär - 2001
Allt jag vill ha - 2003
Varannan vecka - 2006
XX En samling - 2007
Om du vore här - 2008
Vårt älskade 80-tal - 2010
Also appears on the charity compilation album "Jag ser en sol" - 1997

Singles
Vi gör det ikväll - 1995
Om hon bara visste - 1998
Jag fick ditt namn och ditt nummer - 1999
Min ängel - 2000
Hela världen för mig - 2000
Sofie - 2001
Lovar & svär - 2001
Utan att säga farväl - 2001
Förlorad igen - 2002
Allt jag vill ha - 2003
Nyskild, lonely & ensam - 2005
Varannan vecka - 2006

Svensktoppen songs
Jag fick ditt namn och ditt nummer (1999)
Blå, blå ögon (1999-2000)
Min ängel (2000)
Hela världen för mig (2000)
Sofie (2001)
Lovar & svär (2001)
Utan att säga farväl (2001)

References

1985 establishments in Sweden
Dansbands
Musical groups established in 1985